Beverly Fawell (September 17, 1930 – June 22, 2013) was an Illinois politician from Glen Ellyn, part of a family prominent in the Republican Party in Du Page County, Illinois (her brother-in-law was Congressman Harris Fawell).

Education
Born in Oak Park, Illinois, Fawell received her bachelor's degree in elementary education and business administration from Elmhurst College and did graduate studies in political science at Northern Illinois University.

Political career
She served as a member of the Illinois House of Representatives from the 41st district (1981–82), and as a member of the Illinois Senate from the 20th district from 1983 until she resigned her seat in late 1999 after the death of her son Steve, reportedly to take care of his orphaned children, but in January 2000 was appointed to a $85,000-a-year job post as chief of communications and community relations for the Illinois State Toll Highway Authority. She was succeeded by Peter Roskam.

George Ryan connection 
In 1994, Fawell withstood a strong challenge in the Republican primary election from Michael Formento, a DuPage County Board member, former mayor of Glen Ellyn and intra-party foe of Senate President James "Pate" Philip.

Later life and death
After spending ten days at Central DuPage Hospital, Fawell died of chronic heart failure on Saturday, June 22, 2013, at the age of 82.

References 

1930 births
2013 deaths
People from Glen Ellyn, Illinois
People from Oak Park, Illinois
Elmhurst College alumni
Northern Illinois University alumni
Republican Party Illinois state senators
Republican Party members of the Illinois House of Representatives
Women state legislators in Illinois
21st-century American women